"Livin' It Up" is the third single from the band, Northern Uproar, and is from their self-titled debut album. The single peaked at number 24 on the UK Singles Chart in 1996.

Track listing
"Livin' It Up"
"Stonefall"
"Goodbye"
"In My World"

Charts

References

1996 singles
Northern Uproar songs
Heavenly Recordings singles
1996 songs
Song articles with missing songwriters